Randal George Leslie MacAlister was an eminent Anglican priest in the last quarter of the 20th century and the early part of the 21st.

He was born on 31 December 1941 and educated at The Royal School, Armagh and  Trinity College, Dublin. Ordained in 1966, his career began with a  curacy at St Mark's Portadown after which he was Rector of St John’s Greenock, then of St John's Forfar. Next he was Chaplain of  St Mark's Sophia Antipolis in France  before his appointment as Dean of St Andrews, Dunkeld and Dunblane. A keen student of the Gaelic language, he retired in 2006 He died in Corthachy, Angus on 19 June 2009.

References

1941 births
People educated at The Royal School, Armagh
Alumni of Trinity College Dublin
Deans of St Andrews, Dunkeld and Dunblane
2009 deaths